"Miracles in December" is a song by South Korean–Chinese boy band Exo, released on December 4, 2013, as the lead single of their second extended play Miracles in December. It was released in both Korean and Chinese versions by their label SM Entertainment.

Background and release 
Produced by Don Spike, "Miracles in December" according to the description of the album on the site of Korean music Naver Music is a described as a  "pop-ballad" song that uses the piano and strings in the arrangement. The song was composed and arranged by composers veterans such as Andreas Johansson Stone and Rick Hanley in collaboration with the production team of S.M. Entertainment. The song talks about a man who recalls with nostalgia the relationship with his former girlfriend and his desire to return to it, but cannot do so because of the shame and guilt. The Korean version of the song is recorded by D.O., Baekhyun and Chen, and the Chinese version is recorded by Luhan, Chen and Baekhyun.

Music video
On December 4, 2013 both versions of the videos were announced, at 8:00pm (KST) and were released on video-sharing websites. The music video was directed by Jo Soo-hyun, and was filmed in November in Paju, Gyeonggi in a study in Ilsan.

Promotion and live performance
In December,  D.O., Baekhyun and Chen began their promotions for the Korean version of the song on Korean music shows, including M! Countdown on December 5, Music Bank on December 6, Show! Music Core on December 7 and Inkigayo on December 8. In the following week's promotions, S.M. informed that Luhan and Lay also participate in presentations. Baekhyun, Chen and D.O. appeared on the stage of MTV's The Show on December 17 and Show Champion on December 18. The song was also included in the set-list of the winter festival of the group with his classmates seal f(x) SM Town Week: Christmas Wonderland on 23 and 24 December. The Chinese version of "Miracles in December" was acted in the MTV The Show on December 24, 2013 with the members D.O., Luhan, Baekhyun, Chen and Lay.

Reception
The song debuted at number two on Gaon Digital Chart, at number three on Korea K-Pop Hot 100, and at number three on Billboard's US World Digital Song.

Charts

Weekly charts

Monthly charts

Sales

Music program awards

References

Exo songs
2013 songs
2013 singles
Korean-language songs
Mandarin-language songs
SM Entertainment singles